The Alresford Show is an annual one day agricultural show event held every autumn in Titchborne Park, near New Alresford in Hampshire, southern England, UK, and organised by The Alresford & District Agricultural Society (est. 1908). The first Alresford Show was held on Thursday, 9 December 1909; though no show was held from 1914-1919 or 1940-1944 (due to war), or in 1923, 1939 and 1952 (due to Foot and mouth disease), every other year has seen an annual display. The show was cancelled in 2008 (centenary year) due to heavy rainfall and also cancelled in 2020 due to COVID-19.

Venues
1909-1913 The Dean
1920-1938 Arlebury Park
1945-1950 Manor Stud, Bishops Sutton
1951-1958 Sun Lane, Alresford
1959 Field below Sun Hill, Alresford
1960-1983 Tichborne Park

References

External links
Alresford Show Website 

Agricultural shows in England
Recurring events established in 1909
Events in Hampshire